Olearia lanuginosa is a species of flowering plant in the family Asteraceae and is endemic to southern Australia. It is an erect shrub with egg-shaped leaves and white to mauve and yellowish, daisy-like inflorescences.

Description

Taxonomy
Woolly olearia was first formally described in 1956 by James Hamlyn Willis who gave it the name Olearia floribunda var. lanuginosa in the journal Muelleria, based on material collected by Joseph Maiden near Murray Bridge in 1907. In the same year, Norman Arthur Wakefield raised the variety to species status as Olearia lanuginosa in The Victorian Naturalist. The specific epithet (lanuginosa) means "abounding in wool".

Distribution and habitatOlearia lanuginosa'' grows in heath, mallee and woodlands in the Coolgardie, Great Victoria Desert, Mallee and Murchison bioregions of Western Australia, in the south-east of South Australia and in the Big and Little Deserts and Grampians regions of Victoria.

Conservation status
Woolly daisy bush is listed as "not threatened" by the Department of Biodiversity, Conservation and Attractions.

References

lanuginosa
Eudicots of Western Australia
Flora of South Australia
Flora of Victoria (Australia)
Plants described in 1956
Taxa named by James Hamlyn Willis